Osarin is a Palestinian town in the Nablus Governorate in northern West Bank, located 16 kilometers southeast of Nablus. According to the Palestinian Central Bureau of Statistics (PCBS), the town had a population of 1,630 inhabitants in mid-year 2006.

Location
It is bordered by Aqraba to the east, Beita to the north and west, and Qabalan to the south.

History
Shards from Iron Age II,  Crusader/Ayyubid  and  Mamluk eras have been found here.

Ottoman era
Shards from the early  Ottoman  era have been found here. It had a population of 10 households and 4 bachelors, all Muslim. They paid a fixed tax-rate of 33,3 % on agricultural products, including wheat, barley,  summer crops,  olive trees, goats and beehives, in addition to occasional revenues and a press for olive oil or syrup; a total of 2,900 Akçe.

In 1838,  Ausarin  was noted as a village  in the District of El-Beitawy, east of Nablus.

In 1870 Victor Guérin noted the village, situated on a hill.

British Mandate era
In the 1922 census of Palestine, conducted by the British Mandate authorities, Ausarin had a population of 87 Muslims, increasing in the 1931 census  to 122 Muslim, in 34  houses. 

In the 1945 statistics,  Usarin had a population of 200 Muslim,  with 2,185  dunams of land, according to an official land and population survey. Of this, 347 dunams were plantations and irrigable land, 1,098 were used for cereals, while 11 dunams were built-up land.

Jordanian era
In the wake of the 1948 Arab–Israeli War, and after the 1949 Armistice Agreements, Osarin came under Jordanian rule.

The Jordanian census of 1961 found 293 inhabitants in Usarin.

1967-present
After the Six-Day War in 1967,  Osarin   has been under  Israeli occupation. 

During the early months of the First Intifada, on 23 March 1898, Adli Maher Sa'id, aged 14, was shot dead. An Israeli citizen, Ovadia Saluni from Masua, was detained as a suspect,

After the 1995 accords, 83% of the village land is defined as Area B land, while the remaining 17% is Area C.

References

Bibliography

External links
Welcome To 'Usarin
Survey of Western Palestine, Map 15:    IAA, Wikimedia commons 
Osarin Village profile,  Applied Research Institute–Jerusalem (ARIJ)
 Osarin, aerial photo, ARIJ
 Development Priorities and Needs in Osarin, ARIJ

Towns in Nablus Governorate
Villages in the West Bank
Municipalities of the State of Palestine